Fishtoft is one of eighteen civil parishes which, together with Boston, form the Borough of Boston in the county of Lincolnshire, England. Local government has been arranged in this way since the reorganization of 1 April 1974, which resulted from the Local Government Act 1972. This parish forms an electoral ward in itself. Hitherto, the parish had formed part of Boston Rural District, in the Parts of Holland. Holland was one of the three divisions (formally known as parts) of the traditional county of Lincolnshire. Since the Local Government Act of 1888, Holland had been in most respects, a county in itself. The population of the civil parish at the 2011 census was 6,835.

The origin of the place-name is from the Old Norse word toft meaning a building site or a curtilage.  The addition of Fish in the 15th century may be a family name or may indicate a connection with fishing.  The place-name appears as Toft in the Domesday Book of 1086 and as Fishtoft in 1416.

The parish lies along the north-east side of The Haven and accommodates the Pilgrim Fathers Memorial at Scotia Creek.

Fishtoft comprises three aspects – open countryside, the village of Fishtoft, and suburban overspill from Boston.  The fields along Burton Croft Road are bounded by dykes which are a home to water voles (an endangered species in the United Kingdom – Fishtoft is one of only 181 sites where voles can still be found).  Fishtoft has a school, an Anglican church, a shop (at Hawthorn Tree Corner), and football and cricket clubs.

The parish church is dedicated to the Saxon saint St Guthlac. The stonework contains traces of Norman work. There is a reference to the church in the Domesday Book.

The 18th-century Reading Room, a red brick building just off Rectory Close, is now a private house – it was for many decades used as a centre of learning and education.

The historic centre of the village was formerly an island in the tidal marshes – one of a series of islands around the coast of The Wash (each one marked by a medieval church). The parishes along the coast of the Wash had no eastern boundaries, and were continually expanding as new land was reclaimed from the tidal marshes.  The marshes produced methane gas which spontaneously ignited to produce flares, giving rise to the belief that they were haunted by spirits and that the new land needed cleansing before it was safe to use. This may account for the veneration of St Guthlac at Fishtoft, the saint being renowned for driving out devils; a medieval statue of St Guthlac can be seen high up on the tower of the Fishtoft parish church, and formerly held the whip with which he cleansed the land of evil spirits.

The statue of St Guthlac set into the west tower is of considerable interest. Nikolaus Pevsner, in his volume on Lincolnshire (Buildings of England series) says that it is older than the fabric of the tower.  It is possible that this is the original statue of the Guthlac cult, and would have been located inside the chancel.

As well as the parish church of St Guthlac there was a priory "cell" (or small religious house) on the site of what is now Stoke Priory house on the corner of Gaysfield Road; some remains of the priory cell could be seen in the garden of the house until recently.  There was also a small medieval wayside chapel on the western side of Church Green Road, the site indicated by a significant elevation of ground just north of the bungalow opposite The Grange.  In addition, the ground at the corner of Clampgate Road and Burton Croft Road, in what is now an open field, formerly held a substantial medieval building, possibly a manor house, called Panels (or Panals) which included a chapel.

The arrangement of religious buildings in medieval Fishtoft has given rise to speculation that the village may have been the centre of a cult of St Guthlac based on what is now the parish church, the monks of the priory cell helping to minister to the cult, and the wayside chapel in Church Green Road acting as a "slipper chapel" for pilgrims approaching the village along the permanent road from Boston.

The feast of St Guthlac is held on 11 April.

Some evidence of a Roman settlement has been found in the area. There was also an important Anglo-Saxon settlement in the area, confirmed by an excavation on what is now Saxon Gardens. At one stage there was a separate hamlet in the parish called Fenne, in the area that later contained the Ball House Inn, Rochford Tower and Hawthorn Tree Corner. This area formed almost a separate community in the 1950s with its own community hall.

An important feature of the parish is the Hobhole Drain, constructed in the 19th century for land drainage purposes, which enters the River Witham near the Pilgrim Fathers Memorial.

The water tower that formerly stood at the end of Cut End Road has recently been demolished – it was an exact copy of the water tower that still stands in Sutterton.

Notable people
Alec Brader, professional footballer, schoolteacher and youth athletics coach lived at Fishtoft.

References

External links

"Fishtoft", Genuki
Fishtoft Village Website

Civil parishes in Lincolnshire
Villages in Lincolnshire
Borough of Boston